Muhammad Husain (born 29 December 1951) was the Member of the Parliament of Malaysia for the Pasir Puteh constituency in Kelantan from 2008 to 2013. He sat in Parliament as a member of Pan-Malaysian Islamic Party (PAS) in the Pakatan Rakyat opposition coalition. After leaving Parliament he joined 'Parti Ummah Sejahtera Malaysia', a PAS splinter movement formed out of concerns that the party was being insufficiently cooperative with its coalition allies, the Democratic Action Party and the People's Justice Party. In 2015, he joined Parti Amanah Negara (AMANAH), a component party of the Pakatan Harapan (PH) new opposition coalition.

Election results

References

Living people
1951 births
People from Kelantan
Members of the Dewan Rakyat
Former Malaysian Islamic Party politicians
Malaysian people of Malay descent
Malaysian Muslims
National Trust Party (Malaysia) politicians